Charwelton BT Tower is a telecommunication tower built of reinforced concrete at Charwelton near Byfield, Northamptonshire, England. It is a landmark for miles around.

See also
 British Telecom microwave network
 Telecommunications towers in the United Kingdom

References

Buildings and structures in Northamptonshire
Communication towers in the United Kingdom
Towers in Northamptonshire
British Telecom buildings and structures
Transmitter sites in England